Saïd Meghichi (born 5 February 1961) is an Algerian footballer. He played in 16 matches for the Algeria national football team in 1981 and 1985. He was also named in Algeria's squad for the 1988 African Cup of Nations tournament.

References

External links
 

1961 births
Living people
Algerian footballers
Algeria international footballers
1988 African Cup of Nations players
Place of birth missing (living people)
Association footballers not categorized by position
21st-century Algerian people